Evelyne Boisvert (born 24 September 1970) is a Canadian diver. She competed in the women's 3 metre springboard event at the 1992 Summer Olympics.

References

1970 births
Living people
Canadian female divers
Olympic divers of Canada
Divers at the 1992 Summer Olympics
Sportspeople from Trois-Rivières
20th-century Canadian women